Massimo De Carlo is an Italian art dealer, with gallery spaces in Milan, London, and Hong Kong.

De Carlo started working as a gallery assistant for Piero Cavellini in Brescia. In 1987 he opened his first gallery in Milan.

In 2009 De Carlo opened a gallery at 55 South Audley Street, in Mayfair, London. This was followed by a gallery space in Hong Kong in 2016.

References

External links

Italian art dealers
Contemporary art galleries in Italy
Contemporary art galleries in London
Living people
Year of birth missing (living people)